was a Japanese samurai of the early Edo period, who served as a senior retainer of the Date clan of Sendai han. His childhood name was Sannosueke (三之助) later changed to Kojūrō. He bore the same name as his great-grandfather. The lord of Shiroishi Castle, Kagenaga was the third bearer of the common name Kojūrō. During the Date incident (Date-sōdō; 伊達騒動), he was a caretaker for the young daimyō, Kamechiyo (later Date Tsunamura). Upon receiving news of the actions of Harada Munesuke, Kagenaga immediately brought the domain to emergency footing, restraining any disorder from breaking out and saving the Sendai domain from the danger of being attaindered. However, as he was sickly, he resigned his post immediately following the incident's resolution.

Family
 Father: Matsumae Yasuhiro (1606-1668)
 Mother: Katakura Kisa, daughter of Katakura Shigenaga
 Foster Father: Katakura Shigenaga (grandfather)
 Foster Mother: Sanada Oume (Step-grandmother)
 Wife: Hisa later Kanshō-in
 Concubines:
 Ran later Jishō-in
 Tane later Junshō-in
 Fuji later Jōshōin
 Children:
 Omatsu married Date Munefusa by Hisa
 Yasaemon by Ran
 Katakura Muranaga by Ran
 Ohiko
 Otama married Katahira Shigeharu by Tane
 Katakura Murasada by Fuji

Notes

1630 births
1681 deaths
Samurai
Karō
Katakura clan